Municipal Stadium is a multi-use stadium in Drobeta-Turnu Severin, Romania. The stadium holds 20,054 people all on seats and is used mostly for football matches.

In 2009 it was entirely renovated, 20,054 seats were mounted, becoming an all-seater stadium. The floodlighting system was inaugurated in 2010.

Events

Association football

See also

 List of football stadiums in Romania

References

Football venues in Romania
Drobeta-Turnu Severin
Multi-purpose stadiums in Romania
Buildings and structures in Mehedinți County